New Democrats, also known as centrist Democrats, Clinton Democrats, or moderate Democrats, are a centrist ideological faction within the Democratic Party in the United States. As the Third Way faction of the party, they are seen as culturally liberal on social issues while being moderate or fiscally conservative on economic issues. New Democrats dominated the party from the late 1980s through the mid-2010s.

History

Origins 

After the landslide defeats by the Republican Party led by Ronald Reagan and George H. W. Bush in the 1980s, a group of prominent Democrats began to believe their party was out of touch and in need of a radical shift in economic policy and ideas of governance. The Democratic Leadership Council (DLC) was founded in 1985 by Al From and a group of like-minded politicians and strategists. They advocated a political Third Way as an antidote to the electoral successes of Reaganism.

The landslide 1984 presidential election defeat spurred centrist Democrats to action, and the DLC was formed. The DLC, an unofficial party organization, played a critical role in moving the Democratic Party's policies to the center of the American political spectrum. Prominent Democratic politicians such as Senators Al Gore and Joe Biden (both future Vice Presidents, and Biden a future President) participated in DLC affairs prior to their candidacies for the 1988 Democratic Party nomination. The DLC did not want the Democratic Party to be "simply posturing in the middle", and instead framed its ideas as "progressive" and as a "Third Way" to address the problems of its era. Examples of the DLC's policy initiatives can be found in The New American Choice Resolutions.

Although the New Democrat label was briefly used by a progressive reformist group including Gary Hart and Eugene McCarthy in 1989, the term became more widely associated with the New Orleans Declaration and policies of the DLC which in 1990 renamed its bi-monthly magazine from The Mainstream Democrat to The New Democrat. When then-Governor Bill Clinton stepped down as DLC chairman to run for the presidency in the 1992 United States presidential election, he presented himself as a New Democrat.

First wave 
The Watergate Babies from 1974 to the 1978-83 voter "tax revolts" were very similar to Southern Democrats and the Blue Dog Democrats. The first wave sought the votes of White working-class Reagan Democrats with the promise of property taxes that would, in part, subsidize start-ups and business ventures in post-industrial economies. This wave crested in the late 1970s and early 1980s. Despite a preponderance of these Democrats in the South, forerunners to "Atari Democrats" in the West and the Northeast applied these policy frameworks to their own post-industrial sectors.

After 1985, the Democratic Leadership Council, spearheaded by Clinton, maintained its southeastern emphasis on post-industrial finance and the Research Triangle Park, but canvassed and met with potential "Atari Democrat" campaign donors in the West and the Northeast. These proponents of the California-New England-South Third Way became the U.S. "New Democrats." Al From, the founder of the DLC and its leader until 2009, had been a staffer for Louisiana Representative Gillis Long. Among the presidents of the DLC were Tennessee Senator Al Gore and Arkansas Governor Bill Clinton. At the 1992 United States presidential election, Clinton was elected as the 42nd President of the United States, ending twelve years of Republican dominance. The 1994 United States elections gave Republicans control of the House and Senate, effectively wiping out Democratic representation in the South and West.

Second wave

Presidency of Bill Clinton 

Bill Clinton is the Democratic politician most identified with the New Democrats due to his promise of welfare reform in the 1992 United States presidential campaign and its subsequent enactment, his 1992 promise of a middle-class tax cut and his 1993 expansion of the Earned Income Tax Credit for the working poor. New Democrat successes under Clinton, underpinned by the writings of Anthony Giddens on the duality of structure, sustained a unity of opposites that became the hallmark of Third Way political economy. Allusions to this Third Way as syncretic politics and unus pro omnibus, omnes pro uno, should be explicated and the concepts assessed in shifting contexts. New Democrats are often regarded to have inspired Tony Blair in the United Kingdom and his policies within the Labour Party as New Labour, as well as prompting the continental conflation of Third Way approaches to social democracy with previous notions of democratic socialism. The two were often used interchangeably by political scientists and fostered popular conceptions of democratic socialism as a social democratic variant of libertarian socialism.

Clinton presented himself as a centrist candidate to draw White middle-class voters who had left the Democratic Party for the Republican Party. Until 2016 and even after, the Third Way defined and dominated notions of centrism in U.S. partisan politics. In 1990, Clinton became the DLC chair. Under his leadership, the DLC founded two-dozen chapters and created a base of support. Running as a New Democrat, Clinton won the 1992 and 1996 presidential elections.

Legislation signed into domestic law with bipartisan support under President Clinton includes:
 The North American Free Trade Agreement (core international agreement signed during Bush Administration without NAALC/NAAEC, required Congressional approval for implementation)
 The Don't Ask, Don't Tell ban on openly gay people serving in the Armed Forces (repealed in 2010).
 The Defense of Marriage Act that prohibited the federal government from recognizing same-sex marriages (ruled unconstitutional by the U.S. Supreme Court in 2013).
 The Religious Freedom Restoration Act federal religious discrimination statute.
 The Violent Crime Control and Law Enforcement Act, sometimes referred to as the 1994 Omnibus Crime Bill.

New Democrats dialectically adopted GOP proposals and platforms during the campaigns for the 1992 Congressional/state elections and 1992 United States presidential election. Below are subsequent Congressional legislative authorships and voting percentages. Please note that both the 1996 Defense of Marriage Act and 1996 Personal Responsibility and Work Opportunity Act became law three months before the 1996 Congressional/state elections and 1996 United States presidential election.

Legislative Authorship
 1996 Defense of Marriage Act: Bob Barr (R-GA) (GOP introduction)
 1996 Personal Responsibility and Work Opportunity Act: John Kasich (R-OH) with Ideas/Provisions from Clinton's 1994 proposal
 1997 Taxpayer Relief Act: John Kasich (R-OH) with Ideas/Provisions from New Democrats
 1999 Gramm-Leach-Bliley Act: Phil Gramm (R-TX), Jim Leach (R-IA), and Thomas Bliley (R-VA) with Ideas/Provisions from New Democrats

Congressional Democrat Voting Percentages
 1996 Defense of Marriage Act: 64% Dem Representatives support & 72% Dem Senators support
 1996 Personal Responsibility and Work Opportunity Act: 50% Dem Representatives support & 53% Dem Senators support
 1997 Taxpayer Relief Act: 80% Dem Representatives support & 82% Dem Senators support
 1999 Gramm-Leach-Bliley Act: 75% Dem Representatives support & 84% Dem Senators support

The Clinton Administration, supported by Congressional New Democrats, was responsible for proposing and passing the Omnibus Budget Reconciliation Act of 1993, which increased Medicare taxes for taxpayers with annual incomes over $135,000, yet also reduced Medicare spending and benefits across all tax brackets. Congressional Republicans demanded even deeper cuts to Medicare, but Clinton twice vetoed their bills. The Clinton Administration in turn taxed individuals earning annual incomes over $115,000, but also defined taxable "small business" earnings as less than approximately $10 million in annual gross revenue, with tax brackets for high-gross incorporated businesses beginning at that number. According to the Clinton Foundation, the revised brackets and categories increased taxes on the wealthiest 1.2% of taxpayers within these new brackets, while cutting taxes on 15 million low-income families and making tax cuts available to 90% of small businesses. "Small businesses" and taxpayer classifications were reconfigured by these new tax brackets. Again, according to the Clinton Foundation, these brackets raised the top marginal tax rate from 31% to 40%. Additionally, it mandated that the budget be balanced over a number of years through the implementation of spending restraints.

Bill Clinton's promise of welfare reform was passed in the form of the Personal Responsibility and Work Opportunity Act of 1996. Prior to 2018, critics such as Yascha Mounk contended that Clinton's arguments for the virtues of "negative" notions of "personal responsibility [New Orleans Declaration: 'individual responsibility']," propounded within DLC circles during the 1980s, stemmed more from Ronald Reagan's and Peggy Noonan's specific conception of "accountability" than any "positive notion of responsibility" or even multifarious approaches to "accountability." Additional critics distinguish the New Democrat idea of "personal responsibility" from arguments over the extent of limitations on government, if any, in platforms that advance social responsibility. The 1996 United States presidential election, the temporary relegation of Hillary Clinton to the global promotion of microcredit, partisan compromises over this act, conflicts within the Democratic Party, as well as the act's multivalent consequences, all contributed to deliberations over passage and execution of the PRWORA.

Presidency of Barack Obama 

In March 2009, Barack Obama, said in a meeting with the New Democrat Coalition that he was a "New Democrat" and a "pro-growth Democrat", that he "supports free and fair trade" and that he was "very concerned about a return to protectionism".

Throughout the Obama administration, a "free and fair trade" attitude was espoused, including in a 2015 trade report entitled The Economic Benefits of U.S. Trade that noted that free trade "help[s] developing countries lift people out of poverty" and "expand[s] markets for U.S. exports".

Throughout Obama's tenure, approximately 1,000 Democrats lost their seats across all levels of government. Specifically, 958 state legislature seats, 62 house seats, 11 Senate seats, and 12 governorships, with a majority of these elected officials identifying as New Democrats. Some analysts such as Henry Eten at FiveThirtyEight, believe this was due to the changing demographic shift, as more Democrats identified as liberal in 2016 than moderate.

Consequently, many pundits believed that Obama's tenure marked an end of the New Democrats' dominance in the party.

Recent years

Hillary Clinton presidential campaign 

Ahead of the 2016 Democratic Party presidential primaries, many New Democrats were backing the presidential campaign of Hillary Clinton, the wife of former New Democrat president, Bill Clinton who served as a Senator from New York during the 2000s and as Barack Obama's Secretary of State during the early 2010s. Originally considered to be an expected nominee, Clinton faced an unexpected challenge from Vermont Senator, Bernie Sanders, whose campaign garnered the support of progressive and younger Democrats. Ultimately, Clinton won 34 of the 57 contests, compared to Sanders' 23, and garnered about 55 percent of the vote. Nevertheless, commentators saw the primary as a decline in the strength of New Democrats in the party, and an increasing influence of progressive Democrats within the party.

Ahead of the formal announcement of the 2016 Democratic National Convention, WikiLeaks published the Democratic National Committee email leak, in which DNC operatives, many of whom were New Democrats, seemed to deride Bernie Sanders' campaign and discuss ways to advance Clinton's nomination, leading to the resignation of DNC chair, and New Democrat member, Debbie Wasserman Schultz and other implicated officials. The leak was allegedly part of an operation by the Russian government to undermine Hillary Clinton.

Although the ensuing controversy initially focused on emails that dated from relatively late in the primary, when Clinton was nearing the party's nomination, the emails cast doubt on the DNC's neutrality towards progressive and moderate candidates. This was evidenced by alleged bias in the scheduling and conduct of the debates, as well as controversial DNC–Clinton agreements regarding financial arrangements and control over policy and hiring decisions. Other media commentators have disputed the significance of the emails, arguing that the DNC's internal preference for Clinton was not historically unusual and didn't affect the primary enough to sway the outcome. The controversies ultimately led to the formation of a DNC "unity" commission to recommend reforms in the party's primary process.

Decline

Presidency of Joe Biden 

The winner of the 2020 United States presidential election, was Joe Biden, who served as Vice President to Barack Obama. Joe Biden is the 46th president of the United States. In the 2020 United States House of Representatives elections, 13 Democrats lost their seats. All thirteen Democrats that lost their seats had won in the 2018 mid-term elections. Of those 13 members, 10 of them were New Democrats.

During the 117th United States Congress, the New Democrat Coalition lost its status as the largest ideological coalition in favor of the more left leaning Congressional Progressive Caucus.

Ideology 
According to Dylan Loewe, New Democrats tend to identify as fiscally conservative to fiscally moderate and socially liberal.

Columnist Michael Lind argued that neoliberalism for New Democrats was the "highest stage" of left liberalism. The counterculture youth of the 1960s became more fiscally conservative in the 1970s and 1980s but retained their cultural liberalism. Many leading New Democrats, including Bill Clinton, started out in the George McGovern wing of the Democratic Party and gradually moved toward the right on economic and military policy. According to historian Walter Scheidel, both major political parties shifted towards promoting free-market capitalism in the 1970s, with Republicans moving further to the political right than Democrats to the political left. He noted that Democrats played a significant role in the financial deregulation of the 1990s. Anthropologist Jason Hickel and historian Gary Gerstle contended that the neoliberal policies of the Reagan era were carried forward by the Clinton administration, forming a new economic consensus which crossed party lines. According to Gerstle, "across his two terms, Clinton may have done more to free markets from regulation than even Reagan himself had done."

New Democrats have faced criticism from those further to the left. In a 2017 BBC interview, Noam Chomsky said that "the Democrats gave up on the working class forty years ago". Political analyst Thomas Frank asserted that the Democratic Party began to represent the interests of the professional class rather than the working class.

Elected to public office

Presidents 
 Bill Clinton (former)
 Barack Obama (former)
Joe Biden

Vice presidents 
 Al Gore (former)
 Joe Biden (former)

Senate 
Chuck Schumer
Evan Bayh (former)
Mark Begich (former)
 Jacky Rosen
 Jeanne Shaheen
 Maria Cantwell
 Tom Carper
Bob Casey Jr.
Max Cleland (former)
 Hillary Clinton (former)
 Kent Conrad (former)
Chris Coons
Joe Donnelly (former)
Byron Dorgan (former)
Dianne Feinstein
 Al Gore (former)
Maggie Hassan
Heidi Heitkamp (former)
John Hickenlooper
Tim Johnson (former)
Doug Jones (former)
Ted Kaufman (former)
 Amy Klobuchar
Kirsten Gillibrand
Mary Landrieu (former)
Joe Lieberman (former)
Blanche Lincoln (former)
Claire McCaskill (former)
Bill Nelson (former)
Barack Obama (former)
Mark Pryor (former)
Ken Salazar (former)
 Debbie Stabenow
Jon Tester
Mark Warner
Michael Bennet
Jon Ossoff
Mark Kelly
Bob Menendez
Martin Heinrich
Tim Kaine
Patty Murray
Catherine Cortez Masto 
Ben Ray Luján 
Chris Van Hollen 
Richard Blumenthal

House of Representatives 

 Pete Aguilar
 Colin Allred
 Brad Ashford (former)
 Cindy Axne
 Ami Bera
 Don Beyer
 Lisa Blunt Rochester
 Carolyn Bourdeaux
 Brendan Boyle
 Anthony Brindisi (former)
 Anthony Brown
 Shontel Brown
 Julia Brownley
 Cheri Bustos
 Lois Capps (former)
 Salud Carbajal
 Tony Cardenas
 André Carson
 Troy Carter
 Sean Casten
 Joaquin Castro
 Gerry Connolly
 Jim Cooper
 Lou Correa
 Jim Costa
 Joe Courtney
 Angie Craig
 Charlie Crist
 Jason Crow
 Henry Cuellar
 Sharice Davids
 Susan Davis (former)
 Madeleine Dean
 John Delaney (former)
 Suzan DelBene
 Val Demings
 Eliot L. Engel (former)
 Veronica Escobar
 Elizabeth Esty (former)
 Lizzie Fletcher
 Bill Foster
 Vicente Gonzalez
 Josh Gottheimer
 Gwen Graham (former)
 Josh Harder
 Denny Heck (former)
 Jim Himes
 Steven Horsford
 Chrissy Houlahan
 Sara Jacobs
 Bill Keating
 Derek Kilmer
 Ron Kind
 Ann Kirkpatrick
 Raja Krishnamoorthi
 Ann McLane Kuster
 Rick Larsen
 Brenda Lawrence
 Al Lawson
 Susie Lee
 Elaine Luria
 Tom Malinowski
 Sean Patrick Maloney
 Kathy Manning
 Lucy McBath
 Donald McEachin
 Gregory Meeks
 Joe Morelle
 Seth Moulton
 Patrick Murphy
 Donald Norcross
 Beto O'Rourke (former)
 Jimmy Panetta
 Chris Pappas
 Scott Peters
 Ed Perlmutter
 Dean Phillips
 Pedro Pierluisi (former)
 Mike Quigley
 Kathleen Rice
 Cedric Richmond (former)
 Deborah K. Ross
 Raul Ruiz
 Loretta Sanchez (former)
 Adam Schiff
 Brad Schneider
 Kurt Schrader
 David Scott
 Kim Schrier
 Debbie Wasserman Schultz
 Terri Sewell
 Mikie Sherrill
 Elissa Slotkin
 Adam Smith
 Darren Soto
 Greg Stanton
 Haley Stevens
 Marilyn Strickland
 Norma Torres
 Lori Trahan
 David Trone
 Juan Vargas
 Marc Veasey
 Filemon Vela Jr. (former)
 Jennifer Wexton
 Susan Wild
 Nikema Williams

Governors 
Evan Bayh (former)
Mike Beebe (former)
Andy Beshear
Phil Bredesen (former)
Steve Bullock (former)
 John Carney
Tom Carper (former)
Roy Cooper
Jim Doyle (former)
Mike Easley (former)
Dave Freudenthal (former)
Christine Gregoire (former)
Maggie Hassan (former)
Brad Henry (former)
John Hickenlooper (former)
Laura Kelly
Ted Kulongoski (former)
Ronnie Musgrove (former)
Janet Napolitano (former)
 Jared Polis
Gina Raimondo (former)
Brian Schweitzer (former)
Kathleen Sebelius (former)
Don Siegelman (former)
Earl Ray Tomblin (former)
Mark Warner (former)

See also 
 Clintonism
 New Labour
 Coalition for a Democratic Majority
 Labor Right
 Moderate Dems Working Group
 New Democrat Coalition
 New Democrat Network
 Problem Solvers Caucus
 Radical centrism
 Rockefeller Republican
 Senate Centrist Coalition
 Third Way (United States)
 Blue Grit

Further reading

Notes

References

External links 
 About the New Democrat movement, DLC

Centrism in the United States
Centrist political advocacy groups in the United States
Democratic Party (United States)
Factions in the Democratic Party (United States)
Neoliberalism
Political history of the United States
Presidency of Bill Clinton
Presidency of Barack Obama
Presidency of Joe Biden